Ying Ruocheng (June 21, 1929 - December 27, 2003) was a Chinese actor, director, playwright and vice minister of culture from 1986 to 1990. He first came to the attention of Western audiences for his portrayal of Kublai Khan in the 1982 miniseries Marco Polo. He is best known for playing the part of the governor of the detention camp in the Bernardo Bertolucci's film The Last Emperor, and the role of the Tibetan Buddhist Lama Norbu in Little Buddha. He also worked as a theater translator, director, and actor for the Beijing People's Art Theatre, particularly for his role as Pockmark Liu in Lao She's Teahouse and as Willy Loman in Death of a Salesman in 1983, directed by Arthur Miller (Ying also translated the script).

Biography
Ying was born in Beijing into a Manchu family. He studied in a church school in Tianjin in his early years, and later graduated from the Department of Foreign Languages of Tsinghua University. He was forced into the provinces to perform manual labor during the Cultural Revolution.

Ying is the author of a memoir, co-authored by Claire Conceison, "Voices Carry: Behind Bars and Backstage During China's Revolution and Reform" (Lanham: Rowman & Littlefield, 2009).

Ying died on December 27, 2003, at the age of 74.

Personal life
His wife, Wu Shiliang (1928-1987), was a translator, and his son, Ying Da, is also a noted actor. His grandson Ying Rudi is a noted ice hockey player.

Ancestry
His father Ying Qianli (1900–1969) was a professor at National Taiwan University and Fu Jen Catholic University. His mother Cai Baozhen was president of Beijing Children's Library. His grandfather Ying Lianzhi (英敛之; 1867–1926) was the founder of Takungpao and Fu Jen Catholic University. His grandmother Aisin Gioro Shuzhong was a member of the Qing dynasty royal family and therefore related to Puyi the last Emperor of China. His maternal grandfather Cai Rukai (蔡儒楷; 1867–1923) was president of National Beiyang University.

Autobiography

Filmography

References

External links

Patricia Mirrlees (2004-01-12). "Obituary: Ying Ruocheng - Chinese actor and politician". The Guardian.

People's Republic of China politicians from Beijing
1929 births
2003 deaths
Male actors from Beijing
Tsinghua University alumni
Chinese male stage actors
Victims of the Cultural Revolution
Manchu male actors
Chinese male film actors
Chinese male television actors